Category 1 is the lowest hurricane classification on the Saffir–Simpson scale. When a storm's wind speed is between 64 knots (74 mph; 119 km/h; 33 m/s) and 82 knots (95 mph; 153 km/h; 42 m/s), it is classified as a Category 1. Since records began in 1851, 357 tropical cyclones have peaked at this intensity.

Background 
Since HURDAT began in 1851, all tropical cyclones of at least tropical storm intensity were tracked by the National Hurricane Center. In 1971, the Saffir–Simpson scale was devised by Herbert Saffir and Robert Simpson. Category 1 was designed as the lowest hurricane category on the scale.

Systems

1850s

|-
| One ||  ||  ||  || Texas, Mexico ||  ||  ||
|-
| Two ||  ||  ||  || Texas, Mexico ||  ||  ||
|-
| San Lorenzo ||  ||  ||  || Puerto Rico, Hispaniola ||  ||  ||
|-
| Three ||  ||  ||  || Florida, The Bahamas ||  ||  ||
|-
| Four ||  ||  ||  || Greater Antilles ||  ||  ||
|-
| Six ||  ||  ||  || Bermuda ||  ||  ||
|-
| One ||  ||  ||  || Texas, Mexico ||  ||  ||
|-
|Three
|August 11, 1855
|
 || 
|None
|None
|None
|
|-
|Two
|August 13 – 14, 1856
|
 || 
|Barbados, Grenada, Windward Islands
|Unknown
|None
|
|-
|Six
|September 18 – 22, 1856
|
 || 
|None
|None
|None
|
|-
|Three
|September 20 – 26, 1857
| || 
|None
|None
|None
|
|-
|One
|June 12, 1858
| || 
|None
|None
|None
|
|-
|Two
|August 5, 1858
| || 
|None
|None
|None
|
|-
|Four
|September 17 – 24, 1858
| || 
|None
|None
|None
|
|-
|Five
|September 22 – 25, 1858
| || 
|Cuba, Haiti, The Bahamas
|None
|None
|
|-
|Three
|September 2 – 3, 1859
| || 
|Lesser Antilles
|None
|None
|
|-
| Four ||  ||  ||  || United States Gulf Coast, United States East Coast ||  ||  ||
|-
|Five
|September 15 – 18, 1859
|
|
|Southeastern United States, Eastern United States
|
|2
|
|-
| Eight ||  ||  ||  || Mexico, Florida ||  ||  ||
|}

1860-1899

|-
|Three
|September 11, 1860
|
|
|None
|0
|None
|
|-
|Two
|August 13 – 17, 1861
|
|
|Hispaniola, The Bahamas, Cuba, Florida
|0
|Unknown
|
|-
|Four
|September 17, 1861
|
|
|None
|0
|None
|
|-
|Five
|September 27 – 28, 1861
|
|
|United States East Coast
|0
|Unknown
|
|-
|Expedition
|November 1 – 3, 1861
|
|
|United States East Coast
|0
|Unknown
|
|-
|Five
|October 14 – 16, 1862
|
|
|New England
|3
|Unknown
|
|-
|Five
|September 9 – 16, 1863
|
|
|Bermuda
|0
|None
|
|-
| One ||  ||  ||  || Bermuda ||  ||  ||
|-
|Three
|August 26 – September 1, 1864
|
|
|Leeward Islands, Central America
|0
|None
|
|-
|Five
|October 22 – 24, 1864
|
|
|None
|0
|None
|
|-
|Three
|September 4 – 7, 1866
|
|
|Bermuda, Newfoundland and Labrador
|0
|Minimal
|
|-
|Four
|September 18 – 20, 1866
|
|
|None
|0
|None
|
|-
|One
|June 21 – 23, 1867
|
|
|United States East Coast
|0
|None
|
|-
|Four
|August 31 – September 3, 1867
|
|
|New England
|0
|None
|
|-
|Five
|September 4 – 6, 1869
|
|
|Louisiana
|0
|Unknown
|
|-
|The Mobile Hurricane of 1870
|July 30, 1870
|
|
|Alabama, Florida, Louisiana
|Unknown
|
|
|-
|Five
|September 17 – 19, 1870
|
|
|None
|0
|None
|
|-
|Seven
|October 7, 1870
|
|
|None
|0
|None
|
|-
|Eight
|October 10 – 11, 1870
|
|
|None
|0
|None
|
|-
|Eleven
|October 30 – November 3, 1870
|
|
|Central America, Cuba, Florida
|0
|Unknown
|
|-
|Six
|September 5 – 8, 1871
|
|
|Florida
|0
|Unknown
|
|-
|Seven
|September 30 – October 7, 1871
|
|
|Gulf Coast of the United States
|0
|Unknown
|
|-
|Eight
|October 10 – 13, 1871
|
|
|Nova Scotia
|0
|Unknown
|
|-
|Three
|September 9 – 20, 1872
|
|
|Windward Islands
|0
|Unknown
|
|-
|Four
|September 30 – October 6, 1872
|
|
|None
|0
|None
|
|-
|Five
|October 22 – 27, 1872
|
|
|Gulf of Mexico, United States East Coast
|0
|Unknown
|
|-
|Three
|September 18 – 20, 1873
|
|
|Gulf of Mexico, Florida, Georgia
|0
|Unknown
|
|-
|Two
|August 3 – 7, 1874
|
|
|Bermuda
|0
|Unknown
|
|-
|Three
|August 29 – September 7, 1874
|
|
|Newfoundland and Labrador
|0
|Unknown
|
|-
|Six
|September 25 – 30, 1874
|
|
|Gulf of Mexico
|0
|Unknown
|
|-
|One
|August 16 – 19, 1875
|
|
|None
|0
|None
|
|-
|Two
|September 1 – 10, 1875
|
|
|None
|0
|None
|
|-
|Six
|October 12 – 16, 1875
|
|
|United States East Coast
|0
|Unknown
|
|-
|One
|September 9 – 11, 1876
|
|
|Bermuda, Nova Scotia
|0
|None
|
|-
|Two
|September 14 – 21, 1877
|
|
|Gulf Coast of the United States
|0
|Unknown
|
|-
|Three
|September 16 – 22, 1877
|
|
|Atlantic Canada
|0
|None
|
|-
|Two
|August 8 – 19, 1878
|
|
|Leeward Islands, Gulf of Mexico
|Unknown
|Unknown
|
|-
|Three
|August 19 – 20, 1878
|
|
|Atlantic Canada
|0
|None
|
|-
|Eight
|October 9 – 14, 1878
|
|
|United States East Coast
|27
|None
|
|-
|Nine
|October 9 – 15, 1878
|
|
|None
|0
|None
|
|-
|One
|August 9 – 12, 1879
|
|
|United States East Coast
|0
|Unknown
|
|-
|Seven
|October 24 – 29, 1879
|
|
|United States East Coast
|0
|Unknown
|
|-
|Three
|August 15 – 20, 1880
|
|
|Lesser Antilles
|0
|Unknown
|
|-
|Five
|August 26 – September 4, 1880
|
|
|None
|0
|None
|
|-
|Six
|September 6 – 10, 1880
|
|
|Florida
|0
|Unknown
|
|-
|Seven
|September 8 – 10, 1880
|
|
|Newfoundland and Labrador
|0
|Unknown
|
|-
|Nine
|October 5 – 10, 1880
|
|
|Gulf of Mexico
|0
|Unknown
|
|-
|Ten
|October 10 – 14, 1880
|
|
|None
|0
|Unknown
|
|-
|Three
|August 11 – 18, 1881
|
|
|None
|0
|None
|
|-
|Four
|August 16 – 21, 1881
|
|
|Yucatán Peninsula, Cuba, Florida, The Bahamas
|Unknown
|Unknown
|
|-
|One
|August 24 – 25, 1882
|
|
|None
|0
|None
|
|-
|Five
|September 24 – 28, 1882
|
|
|None
|0
|None
|
|-
|One
|August 18 – 27, 1883
|
|
|None
|0
|None
|
|-
|One
|September 1 – 2, 1884
|
|
|Newfoundland and Labrador
|0
|None
|
|-
|Three
|September 10 – 19, 1884
|
|
|The Bahamas, Florida, Georgia
|0
|Unknown
|
|-
|One
|August 7 – 13, 1885
|
|
|Bermuda
|0
|Unknown
|
|-
|Four
|September 17 – 23, 1885
|
|
|Gulf Coast of the United States, United States East Coast
|4
|Unknown
|
|-
|Five
|September 18 – 21, 1885
|
|
|Lesser Antilles
|0
|Unknown
|
|-
|Six
|September 24 – October 2, 1885
|
|
|Gulf Coast of the United States
|Unknown
|Unknown
|
|-
|Seven
|September 26 – 29, 1885
|
|
|None
|0
|None
|
|-
|Four
|July 14 – 22, 1886
|
|
|Yucatán Peninsula, Cuba, Florida
|Unknown
|Unknown
|
|-
|Ten
|September 14 – 18, 1887
|
|
|Newfoundland and Labrador
|0
|None
|
|-
|Thirteen
|October 9 – 20, 1887
|
|
|Lesser Antilles, United States East Coast
|Unknown
|Unknown
|
|-
|Fourteen
|October 10 – 12, 1887
|
|
|None
|0
|None
|
|-
|Seventeen
|November 27 – December 4, 1887
|
|
|The Bahamas
|0
|Unknown
|
|-
|Eighteen
|December 4 – 8, 1887
|
|
|None
|0
|None
|
|-
|One
|June 16 – 18, 1888
|
|
|Texas
|Unknown
|Unknown
|
|-
|Six
|September 23 – 26, 1888
|
|
|United States East Coast
|Unknown
|Unknown
|
|-
|One
|May 16 – 21, 1889
|
|
|None
|0
|None
|
|-
|Two
|June 15 – 20, 1889
|
|
|Cuba, Yucatán Peninsula, United States East Coast
|Unknown
|Unknown
|
|-
|Three
|August 18 – 28, 1889
|
|
|Hispaniola, The Bahamas
|Unknown
|Unknown
|
|-
|Five
|September 2 – 11, 1889
|
|
|None
|0
|None
|
|-
|Four
|October 31 – November 1, 1890
|
|
|Central America
|Unknown
|Unknown
|
|-
|One
|July 3 – 8, 1891
|
|
|Gulf Coast of the United States
|10
|Unknown
|
|-
|Two
|August 17 – 29, 1891
|
|
|Cape Verde
|0
|None
|
|-
|Nine
|October 12 – 20, 1891
|
|
|Windward Islands, Virgin Islands, Newfoundland and Labrador
|Unknown
|Unknown
|
|-
|Two
|August 15 – 21, 1892
|
|
|Leeward Islands
|Unknown
|Unknown
|
|-
|Eight
|October 13 – 17, 1892
|
|
|None
|0
|None
|
|-
|One
|June 10 – 19, 1893
|
|
|Gulf Coast of the United States, United States East Coast
|Unknown
|Unknown
|
|-
|Two
|September 10 – 13, 1897
|
|
|Louisiana, Texas
|29
|
|
|-
|Five
|October 9 – 21, 1897
|
|
|Cuba, The Bahamas, North Carolina, New England
|188
|Unknown
|
|-
|One
|August 2 – 3, 1898
|
|
|The Bahamas, Florida, Alabama
|12
|Unknown
|
|-
|Two
|August 30 – September 1, 1898
|
|
|Georgia
|Unknown
|
|
|-
|Three
|September 3 – 5, 1898
|
|
|None
|0
|None
|
|}

1900-1920

|-
| Three ||  ||  ||  || Greater Antiles, The Bahamas, United States East Coast ||  ||  ||
|-
| Four ||  ||  ||  || The Bahamas, United States Gulf Coast ||  ||  ||
|-
| Six ||  ||  ||  || Cape Verde ||  ||  ||
|-
| Eight ||  ||  ||  || The Caribbean, South Eastern United States ||  ||  ||
|-
| Thirteen ||  ||  ||  || None ||  ||  ||
|-
| Two ||  ||  ||  || Mexico, Eastern United States ||  ||  ||
|-
| One ||  ||  ||  || The Bahamas, Bermuda ||  ||  ||
|-
| Three ||  ||  ||  || The Bahamas, United States Gulf Coast ||  ||  ||
|-
| Ten ||  ||  ||  || None ||  ||  ||
|-
| One ||  ||  ||  || Jamaica, Cuba, The Bahamas ||  ||  ||
|-
| Two ||  ||  ||  || United States East Coast ||  ||  ||
|-
| Three ||  ||  ||  || Central America ||  ||  ||
|-
| Four ||  ||  ||  || Cuba, Florida, The Bahamas ||  ||  ||
|-
| Five ||  ||  ||  || United States East Coast ||  ||  ||
|-
| Eleven ||  ||  ||  || Cuba, The Bahamas ||  ||  ||
|-
| Two ||  ||  ||  || The Bahamas, United States East Coast ||  ||  ||
|-
| Three ||  ||  ||  || The Bahamas, United States East Coast ||  ||  ||
|-
| Two ||  ||  ||  || United States Gulf Coast ||  ||  ||
|-
| Four ||  || 
| || United States Gulf Coast ||  ||  ||
|-
| Five ||  ||  ||  || Bermuda ||  ||  ||
|-
| One ||  ||  ||  || Central America ||  ||  ||
|-
| Four ||  ||  ||  || United States East Coast ||  ||  ||
|-
| Five ||  ||  ||  || United States East Coast ||  ||  ||
|-
| Six ||  ||  ||  || Cuba ||  ||  ||
|-
| One ||  ||  ||  || United States East Coast ||  ||  ||
|-
| Eight ||  ||  ||  || The Caribbean ||  ||  ||
|-
| Ten ||  ||  ||  || None ||  ||  ||
|-
| Three ||  ||  ||  || South Carolina ||  ||  ||
|-
|Three ||  ||  ||  || Southeastern United States ||  ||  ||
|-
| Five ||  ||  ||  || Florida ||  ||  ||
|}

1920s

|-
|One
|June 16 – 26, 1921
|
|
|Central America, Gulf of Mexico
|Unknown
|None
|
|-
|Two
|September 4 – 8, 1921
|
|
|Mexico
|$19 million
|215
|
|-
|Four
|September 8 – 14, 1921 
|
|
|None
|None
|None
|
|-
|Three
|September 18 – 24, 1922
|
|
|None
|None
|None
|
|-
|Four
|September 10 – 13, 1923
|
|
|Newfoundland
|None
|None
|
|-
|Six
|October 12 – 17, 1923
|
|
|Mexico, Gulf Coast of the United States
|Unknown
|None
|
|-
|Five
|September 13 – 17, 1924
|
|
|United States East Coast
|Unknown
|Unknown
|
|-
|Eleven
|November 5 – 14, 1924
|
|
|Cuba, The Bahamas
|Unknown
|Unknown
|
|-
|One
|August 18 – 24, 1925
|
|
|None
|None
|None
|
|-
|Two
|September 2 – 11, 1927
|
|
|Cape Verde
|None
|None
|
|-
|Three
|September 22 – 29, 1927
|
|
|None
|$4.36 million
|19
|
|-
|1928 Haiti hurricane
|August 7 – 17, 1928
|
|
|Windward Islands, Leeward Islands, Gulf Coast of the United States
|$2 million
|210
|
|-
|Six
|September 10 – 15, 1928
|
|
|None
|None
|None
|
|-
|One
|June 27 — 30, 1929
|
|
|Gulf of Mexico
|$365 thousand
|Unknown
|
|-
|Five
|October 19 – 22, 1929
|
|
|None
|None
|None
|
|}

1930-2010

|-
|Eight
|September 23 – 28, 1931
|
|
|None
|None
|None
|
|-
|1932 Florida–Alabama hurricane
|August 26 – September 2, 1932
|
|
|United States Gulf Coast
|$226 thousand
|Unknown
|
|-
|1933 Florida–Mexico hurricane
|July 23 – August 5, 1933
|
|
|Leeward Islands, United States Gulf Coast, Mexico
|$500 thousand
|Unknown
|
|-
|Fifteen
|September 24 – 27, 1933
|
|
|Azores
|None
|None
|
|-
|Eighteen
|October 25 – November 7, 1933
|
|
|Cuba, The Bahamas
|$3 million
|23
|
|-
|Two
|July 12 – 16, 1934
|
|
|Bermuda, Newfoundland and Labrador
|None
|None
|
|-
|Three
|July 22 – 26, 1934
|
|
|United States Gulf Coast
|Unknown
|Unknown
|
|-
|Five
|August 26 – September 1, 1934
|
|
|United States Gulf Coast
|Unknown
|Unknown
|
|-
|1935 Jérémie hurricane
|October 18 – 27, 1935
|
|
|Central America, Jamaica, Cuba, Haiti
|
|2,150
|
|-
|Three
|June 26 – 28, 1936
|
|
|Texas
|$550 thousand
|Unknown
|
|-
|Eight
|August 15 – 20, 1936
|
|
|Yucatán Peninsula, Tamaulipas
|Unknown
|None
|
|-
|Eleven
|August 28 – 30, 1936
|
|
|Yucatán Peninsula, Veracruz
|Unknown
|None
|
|-
|Eleven
|October 19 – 21, 1937
|
|
|None
|None
|None
|
|-
|Two
|August 7 – 19, 1939
|
|
|Puerto Rico, Turks and Caicos Islands, The Bahamas, Eastern United States
|$2 thousand
|None
|
|-
|Six
|October 28 – November 6, 1939
|
|
|Honduras, The Caribbean, Bermuda
|Unknown
|2
|
|-
| Eight ||  ||  ||  || Nicaragua ||  ||  ||
|-
|Three
|September 18 – 25, 1941
|
|
|None
|None
|None
|
|-
|Two
|August 17 – 23, 1942
|
|
|Texas
|$790 thousand
|None
|
|-
|One
|July 13 – 18, 1944
|
|
|Bermuda
|None
|None
|
|-
|Three
|July 30 – August 4, 1944
|
|
|North Carolina, Mid-Atlantic states
|$2 million
|None
|
|-
|Eight
|September 19 – 22, 1944
|
|
|Mexico
|Unknown
|Unknown
|
|-
|Twelve
|October 11 – 15, 1944
|
|
|None
|None
|None
|
|-
|Ten
|October 2 – 7, 1945
|
|
|Belize, Guatemala, Honduras, Mexico
|Unknown
|1
|
|-
|Two
|July 5 – 9, 1946
|
|
|North Carolina
|Minor
|0
|
|-
|Three
|August 18 – 27, 1947
|
|
|Cuba, Louisiana, Texas
|$800 thousand
|1
|
|-
|Five
|September 1 – 7, 1948
|
|
|Louisiana, Mississippi, Midwestern United States
|$900 thousand
|0
|
|-
|Ten
|November 8 – 11, 1948
|
|
|None
|None
|None
|
|-
|Ten
|September 20 – 22, 1949
|
|
|Saint Croix, Puerto Rico, Dominican Republic
|$1.012 million
|15
|
|-
|Thirteen
|October 13 – 19, 1949
|
|
|Cuba, The Bahamas
|Unknown
|None
|
|-
|Love
|October 18 – 22, 1950
|
|
|Georgia, Louisiana, Southwestern Florida
|Minimal
|None
|
|-
|Able
|May 15 – 23, 1951
|
|
|Florida, Bahamas, North Carolina, South Carolina, Virginia
|Minimal
|None
|
|-
|Dog
|August 27 – September 5, 1951
|
|
|Martinique, Saint Lucia, Hispaniola, Jamaica
|$3 million
|7
|
|-
|Jig
|October 15 – 17, 1951
|
|
|North Carolina, Virginia
|None
|None
|
|-
|Twelve
|September 2 – 11, 1951
|
|
|None
|None
|None
|
|-
|Barbara
|August 11 – 15, 1953
|
|
|United States East Coast, Atlantic Canada
|$1.3 million
|9
|
|-
|Dolly
|September 8 – 12, 1953
|
|
|Virgin Islands, Puerto Rico, The Bahamas, Bermuda
|Minimal
|None
|
|-
|Gail
|October 2 – 12, 1953
|
|
|None
|None
|None
|
|-
|Hazel
|October 7 – 10, 1953
|
|
|Florida, Sable Island
|$250 thousand
|None
|
|-
|Dolly
|August 31 – September 2, 1954
|
|
|None
|None
|None
|
|-
|Alice
|December 30, 1954 – January 6, 1955
|
|
|Saba, Anguilla, Lesser Antilles
|$623 thousand
|None
|
|-
|Gladys
|September 3 – 6, 1955
|
|
|Western Mexico, Yucatán Peninsula
|$500 thousand
|None
|
|-
|Anna
|July 25 – 27, 1956
|
|
|Mexico
|$50 thousand
|None
|
|-
|Flossy
|September 20 – 25, 1956
|
|
|Yucatán Peninsula, Louisiana, Mississippi, Alabama, Florida, Georgia, South Carolina, North Carolina, Virginia
|$24.9 million
|15
|
|-
|Frieda
|September 20 – 26, 1957
|
|
|Bermuda, Newfoundland
|None
|None
|
|-
|Fifi
|September 4 – 11, 1958
|
|
|None
|None
|None
|
|-
|Escuminac (Three)
|June 18 – 19, 1959
|
|
|Florida, Atlantic Canada
|$2.5 million
|35
|
|-
|Cindy
|July 4 – 11, 1959
|
|
|The Carolinas, Mid-Atlantic states, New England, Canadian Maritime Provinces
|$75 thousand
|6
|
|-
|Debra
|July 22 – 27, 1959
|
|
|Texas, Oklahoma, United States Gulf Coast, Midwestern United States
|$7 million
|None
|
|-
|Flora
|September 9 – 12, 1959
|
|
|None
|None
|None
|
|-
|Judith
|October 14 – 22, 1959
|
|
|Florida
|Minimal
|None
|
|-
|Abby
|July 9 – 17, 1960
|
|
|Lesser Antilles, Puerto Rico, Leeward Antilles, Hispaniola, Jamaica, Nicaragua, Honduras, Belize, Guatemala, Mexico
|$640 thousand
|6
|
|-
|Cleo
|August 17 – 21, 1960
|
|
|Greater Antilles, The Bahamas, Northeastern United States, Nova Scotia
|Minimal
|None
|
|-
|Debbie
|September 6 – 16, 1961
|
|
|Cape Verde, Azores, Ireland, United Kingdom, Norway, Soviet Union
|$50 million
|78
|
|-
|Jenny
|November 1 – 10, 1961
|
|
|Puerto Rico, Leeward Islands
|None
|None
|
|-
|Alma
|August 26 – 30, 1962
|
|
|Puerto Rico, United States East Coast
|$1 million
|1
|
|-
|Ten
|November 28 – December 4, 1962
|
|
|United States East Coast
|Unknown
|None
|
|-
|Four
|September 9 – 14, 1963
|
|
|Bermuda
|None
|None
|
|-
|Debra
|September 19 – 24, 1963
|
|
|None
|None
|None
|
|-
|Three
|July 28 – August 2, 1964
|
|
|British Isles
|None
|None
|
|-
|Carol
|September 16 – 30, 1965
|
|
|Azores
|None
|None
|
|-
|Becky
|July 1 – 3, 1966
|
|
|None
|None
|None
|
|-
|Celia
|July 13 – 21, 1966
|
|
|Atlantic Canada, Quebec
|None
|None
|
|-
|Dorothy
|July 22 – 30, 1966
|
|
|None
|None
|None
|
|-
|Lois
|November 4 – 11, 1966
|
|
|Azores
|None
|None
|
|-
|Arlene
|August 28 – September 4, 1967
|
|
|Newfoundland
|None
|None
|
|-
|Doria
|September 8 – 21, 1967
|
|
|United States East Coast
|$150 thousand
|3
|
|-
|Fern
|October 1 – 4, 1967
|
|
|Mexico, Texas
|Minimal
|3
|
|-
|Heidi
|October 19 – 31, 1967
|
|
|Bermuda
|Minimal
|None
|
|-
|Abby
|June 1 – 13, 1968
|
|
|Cuba, Florida, Georgia, The Carolinas
|$450,000
|6
|
|-
|Brenda
|June 17 – 26, 1968
|
|
|Florida
|Minor
|None
|
|-
|Dolly
|August 10 – 17, 1968
|
|
|The Carolinas, Florida, Azores
|Minor
|None
|
|-
|Blanche
|August 11 – 12, 1969
|
|
|Sable Island
|None
|None
|
|-
|Holly
|September 14 – 21, 1969
|
|
|Leeward Islands
|None
|None
|
|-
|Ten
|September 21 – 26, 1969
|
|
|None
|None
|None
|
|-
|Seventeen
|October 31 – November 7, 1969
|
|
|None
|None
|None
|
|-
|Martha
|November 21 – 25, 1969
|
|
|Panama, Costa Rica
|$30 million
|5
|
|-
|Alma
|May 17 – 26, 1970
|
|
|Cayman Islands, Jamaica, Cuba, Southeastern United States
|Minor
|8
|
|-
|Nineteen
|October 20 – 28, 1970
|
|
|None
|None
|None
|
|-
|Two
|August 3 – 7, 1971
|
|
|None
|None
|None
|
|-
|Beth
|August 10 – 16, 1971
|
|
|The Bahamas, Florida, Nova Scotia, Newfoundland
|$5.1 million
|1
|
|-
|Fern
|September 3 – 13, 1971
|
|
|Louisiana, Texas, northern Mexico
|$30.2 million
|2
|
|-
|Irene
|September 11 – 20, 1971
|
|
|Lesser Antilles, Leeward Antilles, Central America
|$1 million
|3
|
|-
|Agnes
|June 14 – 23, 1972
|
|
|Yucatán Peninsula, western Cuba, Florida Panhandle, Georgia, North Carolina, Virginia, Maryland, Pennsylvania, New York, Atlantic Canada
|$2.1 billion
|128
|
|-
|Dawn
|September 5 – 14, 1972
|
|
|Southeastern United States
|Minimal
|None
|
|-
|Alice
|July 1 – 7, 1973
|
|
|Bermuda, Newfoundland
|Minimal
|None
|
|-
|Brenda
|August 18 – 22, 1973
|
|
|Cayman Islands, Mexico
|Unknown
|10
|
|-
|Fran
|October 8 – 12, 1973
|
|
|Azores
|Minimal
|None
|
|-
|Gertrude
|September 25 – October 4, 1974
|
|
|Windward Islands
|Unknown
|None
|
|-
|Blanche
|July 23 – 28, 1975
|
|
|Maine, Nova Scotia
|$6.2 million
|None
|
|-
|Candice
|August 18 – 24, 1976
|
|
|None
|None
|None
|
|-
|Holly
|October 22 – 28, 1976
|
|
|None
|None
|None
|
|-
|Babe
|September 3 – 9, 1977
|
|
|Florida, Louisiana, Alabama, Mississippi, Tennessee, Georgia, South Carolina, North Carolina and Virginia
|$13 million
|None
|
|-
|Clara
|September 5 – 11, 1977
|
|
|The Carolinas, Nova Scotia
|Minimal
|None
|
|-
|Dorothy
|September 26 – 29, 1977
|
|
|Bermuda, Newfoundland
|None
|None
|
|-
|Evelyn
|October 13 – 15, 1977
|
|
|Bermuda, Nova Scotia, Newfoundland
|None
|None
|
|-
|Cora
|August 7 – 12, 1978
|
|
|Windward Islands, St. Lucia, Barbados, Grenada
|Minimal
|1
|
|-
|Kendra
|October 28 – November 1, 1978
|
|
|Puerto Rico, United States East Coast
|$6 million
|1
|
|-
|Bob
|July 9 – 16, 1979
|
|
|Louisiana, Mississippi, Alabama, Midwestern United States
|$20 million
|1
|
|-
|Henri
|September 15 – 24, 1979
|
|
|Mexico, Florida
|Minimal
|None
|
|-
|Charley
|August 20 – 25, 1980
|
|
|North Carolina
|None
|7
|
|-
|Georges
|September 1 – 8, 1980
|
|
|Newfoundland
|None
|None
|
|-
|Earl
|September 4 – 10, 1980
|
|
|None
|None
|None
|
|-
|Karl
|November 25 – 28, 1980
|
|
|None
|None
|None
|
|-
|Dennis
|August 7 – 21, 1981
|
|
|Lesser Antilles, Greater Antilles, The Bahamas, Florida, Georgia, The Carolinas, Virginia
|$15 million
|0
|
|-
|Emily
|August 31 – September 11, 1981
|
|
|None
|None
|None
|
|-
|Katrina
|November 3 – 7, 1981
|
|
|Cayman Islands, Jamaica, Cuba, The Bahamas, Turks and Caicos Islands
|Minimal
|2
|
|-
|Alberto
|June 1 – 6, 1982
|
|
|Cuba, Florida
|$85 million
|23
|
|-
|Barry
|August 23 – 29, 1983
|
|
|Florida, Texas, Mexico
|Minimal
|None
|
|-
|Chantal
|September 10 – 15, 1983
|
|
|None
|None
|None
|
|-
|Hortense
|September 23 – October 2, 1984
|
|
|None
|None
|None
|
|-
|Klaus
|November 5 – 13, 1984
|
|
|Puerto Rico, Leeward Islands
|$152 million
|2
|
|-
|Lili
|December 12 – 24, 1984
|
|
|Puerto Rico, Hispaniola
|Minimal
|None
|
|-
|Bob
|July 21 – 26, 1985
|
|
| United States East Coast
|$20 million
|5
|
|-
|Claudette
|August 9 – 16, 1985
|
|
|Bermuda, Azores
|None
|None
|
|-
|Danny
|August 12 – 18, 1985
|
|
|Cuba, United States Gulf Coast, Tennessee, The Carolinas, Virginia
|$100 million
|5
|
|-
|Juan
|October 26 – November 21, 1985
|
|
| United States Gulf Coast, central United States, Canada
|$1.5 billion
|12
|
|-
|Bonnie
|
|
|
|Texas, Louisiana, Southeastern United States
|$42 million
|5
|
|-
|Charley
|
|
|
| United States East Coast, United Kingdom
|$15 million
|15
|
|-
|Frances
|
|
|
|None
|None
|None
|
|-
|Arlene
|
|
|
|The Bahamas, Bermuda
|$8 thousand
|None
|
|-
|Floyd
|
|
|
|Cuba, Florida, The Bahamas
|$500 thousand
|1
|
|-
|Debby
|
|
|
|Mexico
|Unknown
|20
|
|-
|Florence
|
|
|
|Yucatán Peninsula, Louisiana, Mississippi, Alabama, Florida
|$2.9 million
|1
|
|-
|Chantal
|
|
|
|Texas, Louisiana, Oklahoma, Midwestern United States
|$100 million
|13
|
|-
|Felix
|
|
|
|None
|None
|None
|
|-
|Jerry
|
|
|
|Texas, eastern United States
|$70 million
|3
|
|-
|Bertha
|
|
|
|The Bahamas, United States East Coast, Bermuda, Atlantic Canada
|$3.91 million
|9
|
|-
|Josephine
|
|
|
|None
|None
|None
|
|-
|Klaus
|
|
|
|Lesser Antilles, Puerto Rico, Hispaniola, Turks and Caicos Islands, The Bahamas, Southeastern United States
|$1 million
|11
|
|-
|Lili
|
|
|
|Bermuda, United States East Coast, Atlantic Canada
|None
|None
|
|-
|Nana
|
|
|
|Bermuda
|Moderate
|None
|
|-
|1991 Perfect Storm
|
|
|
|Northeastern United States, Mid-Atlantic states, Eastern Canada
|$200 million
|13
|
|-
|Frances
|
|
|
|Newfoundland, Iberian Peninsula
|None
|None
|
|-
|Floyd
|
|
|
|Newfoundland
|None
|None
|
|-
|Harvey
|
|
|
|None
|None
|None
|
|-
|Chris
|
|
|
|Bermuda
|None
|None
|
|-
|Gordon
|
|
|
|Central America, Cayman Islands, Jamaica, Hispaniola, Cuba, Turks and Caicos Islands, The Bahamas, Florida, Georgia, Mid-Atlantic states
|$594 million
|1,152
|
|-
|Allison
|
|
|
|Yucatán Peninsula, western Cuba, Florida, Georgia, The Carolinas, Atlantic Canada
|$1.7 million
|1
|
|-
|Noel
|
|
|
|None
|None
|None
|
|-
|Tanya
|
|
|
|Azores
|Minimal
|1
|
|-
|Cesar
|
|
|
|Windward Islands, Trinidad and Tobago, Leeward Antilles, Venezuela, Colombia, Mexico, Socorro Island, Panama, Guatemala, El Salvador
|$203 million
|113
|
|-
|Dolly
|
|
|
|Belize, Mexico, Texas
|Unknown
|14
|
|-
|Marco
|
|
|
|Cuba, Hispaniola, Central America, Jamaica, Florida
|$8.2 million
|15
|
|-
|Bill
|
|
|
|Newfoundland
|None
|None
|
|-
|Danny
|
|
|
|Louisiana, Alabama, Southeastern United States, Mid-Atlantic states, New England
|$100 million
|9
|
|-
|Ivan
|
|
|
|None
|None
|None
|
|-
|Lisa
|
|
|
|None
|None
|None
|
|-
|Nicole
|
|
|
|None
|None
|None
|
|-
|Debby
|
|
|
|Lesser Antilles, Puerto Rico, Hispaniola, Turks and Caicos Islands, Cuba, Jamaica
|$735 thousand
|1
|
|-
|Florence
|
|
|
|United States East Coast, Bermuda, Atlantic Canada
|None
|3
|
|-
|Gordon
|
|
|
|Belize, Yucatán Peninsula, Cuba, United States East Coast, Atlantic Canada
|$10.8 million
|26
|
|-
|Joyce
|
|
|
|Trinidad and Tobago, Windward Islands, Leeward Islands
|Minimal
|None
|
|-
|Gabrielle
|
|
|
|Florida, Newfoundland
|> 230 million
|3
|
|-
|Karen
|
|
|
|Bermuda, Atlantic Canada
|$1.4 million
|None
|
|-
|Noel
|
|
|
|Atlantic Canada
|Minimal
|None
|
|-
|Olga
|
|
|
|Bermuda, The Bahamas, Cuba, Florida
|Minimal
|None
|
|-
|Kyle
|
|
|
|Bermuda, Florida, Georgia, The Carolinas, British Isles
|$5 million
|1
|
|-
|Claudette
|
|
|
|Windward Islands, Jamaica, Yucatán Peninsula, Northern Mexico, Texas
|$181 million
|3
|
|-
|Danny
|
|
|
|None
|None
|None
|
|-
|Erika
|
|
|
|Florida, Mexico, Southern Texas
|$100 thousand
|2
|
|-
|Gaston
|
|
|
|The Carolinas, Virginia, Maryland, Delaware, Massachusetts
|$130 million
|9
|
|-
|Lisa
|
|
|
|None
|None
|None
|
|-
|Cindy
|
|
|
|Yucatán Peninsula, The Carolinas, Alabama, Mississippi, Louisiana
|$320 million
|3
|
|-
|Nate
|
|
|
|Bermuda, United States East Coast, Scotland, Norway
|Minimal
|2
|
|-
|Ophelia
|
|
|
|The Bahamas, Eastern Coast of the United States, Atlantic Canada, Europe
|$70 million
|3
|
|-
|Philippe
|
|
|
|Bermuda
|Minimal
|None
|
|-
|Stan
|
|
|
|Costa Rica, Nicaragua, Honduras, El Salvador, Belize, Guatemala, Mexico
|$3.96 billion
|1,668
|
|-
|Vince
|
|
|
|Madeira Islands, Southern Portugal, Southwestern Spain
|Minimal
|None
|
|-
|Epsilon
|
|
|
|None
|Minimal
|None
|
|-
|Ernesto
|
|
|
|Lesser Antilles, Puerto Rico, Hispaniola, Cuba, United States East Coast, Atlantic Canada
|$500 million
|11
|
|-
|Florence
|
|
|
|Bermuda, Newfoundland, United States East Coast, Atlantic Canada, Iceland, Greenland
|$200 thousand
|None
|
|-
|Isaac
|
|
|
|Newfoundland
|Minimal
|None
|
|-
|Humberto
|
|
|
|Texas, Louisiana, Mississippi, The Carolinas
|$50 million
|1
|
|-
|Karen
|
|
|
|None
|Minimal
|None
|
|-
|Lorenzo
|
|
|
|Central Mexico
|$92 million
|6
|
|-
|Noel
|
|
|
| The Caribbean, The Bahamas, Florida, Eastern United States, Eastern Canada, Greenland, Western Europe
|$580 million
|222
|
|-
|Hanna
|
|
|
|Puerto Rico, Turks and Caicos Islands, The Bahamas, Hispaniola, United States East Coast, Atlantic Canada
|$160 million
|537
|
|-
|Kyle
|
|
|
|Puerto Rico, Hispaniola, Bermuda, New England, Atlantic Canada
|$57.1 million
|8
|
|}

2010–present

|-
|Lisa ||  ||  ||  || None ||  ||  ||
|-
| Otto ||  ||  ||  || Leeward Islands, Virgin Islands, Puerto Rico ||  ||  ||
|-
|Shary ||  ||  ||  || None ||  ||  ||
|-
|Maria
|
|
|
|Lesser Antilles, Bermuda, Newfoundland, Europe
|
|None
|
|-
|Nate
|
|
|
|Mexico
|Minimal
|5
|
|-
|Philippe
|
|
|
|None
|Minimal
|None
|
|-
|Chris
|
|
|
|Bermuda, Atlantic Canada
|Minimal
|None
|
|-
|Isaac
|
|
|
| The Caribbean, The Bahamas, Southeastern United States, Midwestern United States
|
|41
|
|-
|Leslie
|
|
|
|Leeward Islands, Bermuda, Atlantic Canada
|
|None
|
|-
|Nadine
|
|
|
|Mexico, Texas
|Minimal
|None
|
|-
|Humberto
|
|
|
|Cape Verde
|Minimal
|None
|
|-
|Ingrid
|
|
|
|Mexico, Texas
|
|32
|
|-
|Bertha
|
|
|
|The Caribbean, Cuba, Turks and Caicos Islands, The Bahamas, United States East Coast, Western Europe
|
|4
|
|-
|Cristobal
|
|
|
|Puerto Rico, Hispaniola, Turks and Caicos Islands, United States East Coast, Bermuda, Iceland
|Unknown
|7
|
|-
|Fay
|
|
|
|Bermuda
|
|None
|
|-
| || || ||  || West Africa, Cape Verde||  || 9|| 
|-
| || ||  ||  || Martinique, Puerto Rico, Hispaniola, The Bahamas, Europe || Minimal||None
|
|-
| || || ||  || Azores ||  Minimal|| 1
|
|-
| || || ||  || Greater Antilles, Central America, Mexico || ||94||
|-
|  || ||  ||  || East Coast of the United States || ||5||
|-
|  || ||  ||  || Central America, Mexico || 
|0||
|-
|  || || 150 | ||  || Central America, Mexico, eastern United States || ||48||
|-
|  || ||  ||  || Lesser Antilles, Greater Antilles ||  ||  ||
|-
| Isaac || ||  ||  || Lesser Antilles ||  ||  ||
|-
|Leslie
|
|
|
|Azores, Iberian Peninsula
|
|17
|
|-
| Barry ||  ||  ||  || Southeastern United States ||  ||  ||
|-
| Pablo ||  || || || Azores ||  ||  ||
|-
| Hanna ||  || || || Cuba, Hispaniola, United States Gulf Coast, Mexico ||  ||  ||
|-
| Isaias || || || || The Caribbean, The Bahamas, United States East Coast, Eastern Canada ||  ||  ||
|-
| Marco ||  || || || Central America, Yucatán Peninsula, United States Gulf Coast ||  ||  ||
|-
| Nana ||  || || || Honduras, Jamaica, Belize, Guatemala ||  ||  ||
|-
| Gamma ||  || || || Honduras, Yucatán Peninsula, Cayman Islands, Cuba, Florida ||  ||  ||
|-
| Elsa ||  || || || The Caribbean, South Atlantic United States, Atlantic Canada ||  ||  ||
|-
| Henri || || || || Bermuda, Northeastern United States ||  ||  ||
|-
| Nicholas || || || || Mexico, Texas ||  ||  ||
|-
| Danielle || || || || None || None || None ||
|-
| Julia || || || || Trinidad and Tobago, Venezuela, ABC Islands, Colombia, Central America ||   ||  ||
|-
| Lisa ||  ||  ||  || Windward Islands, Jamaica, Cayman Islands, Central America|| || None ||
|-
| Martin ||  || || || None || None || None ||
|-
| Nicole ||  ||  ||  || Dominican Republic, Puerto Rico, The Bahamas, Southeastern United States ||  ||  ||	
|-
|}

Other systems 

In 1996, the Lake Huron cyclone formed over the Great Lakes, and became a Category 1 equivalent subtropical cyclone at its peak.

Michael Chenoweth
A climate researcher: Michael Chenoweth has suggested that the following systems were Category 1 hurricane's on the Saffir-Simpson hurricane wind scale: 

|-
| Unnamed ||  || ||  || Mexico ||  ||  ||
|-
| Unnamed ||  || ||  || None ||  ||  ||
|-
| Unnamed ||  || ||  || Mexico ||  ||  ||
|-
| Unnamed ||  || ||  || None ||  ||  ||
|-
| Unnamed ||  || ||  || None ||  ||  ||
|-
| Unnamed ||  ||  ||  || Texas, Mexico ||  ||  ||
|-
| Unnamed ||  ||  ||  || Mid Atlantic United States ||  ||  ||
|-
| Unnamed ||  ||  ||  || None ||  ||  ||
|}

Subtropical hurricanes

Very rarely, a subtropical cyclone will strengthen into a Category 1 subtropical hurricane. There have only been two known cases of this phenomenon:

|-
|One ||  ||  ||  || None ||  ||  || 
|-
|One ||  ||  ||  || Newfoundland ||  ||  || 
|}

Climatology

Landfalls

See also 
 List of Category 1 Pacific hurricanes
 List of Category 1 South Pacific tropical cyclones
 List of Category 1 Australian region tropical cyclones
List of Category 2 Atlantic hurricanes
List of Category 3 Atlantic hurricanes
List of Category 4 Atlantic hurricanes
List of Category 5 Atlantic hurricanes
Lists of Atlantic hurricanes

References 

Category 1 Atlantic hurricanes
Atlantic 1
Category 1